The Lazarev Sea (More Lazareva) is a proposed name for a marginal sea of the Southern Ocean.

History  
The Lazarev Sea was named in 1962 by the Soviet Antarctic Expedition in memory of Russian admiral Mikhail Lazarev (1788–1851), who discovered the Antarctic mainland with Fabian Gottlieb von Bellingshausen in 1820. The 2002 IHO draft was never approved by the IHO (or any other organization), and the 1953 IHO document (which does not contain this name) remains currently in force.  Leading geographic authorities and atlases do not use the name, including the 2014 10th edition World Atlas from National Geographic Society and the 2014 12th edition of the Times Atlas of the World. But Soviet and Russian-state maps do.

Physical geography 

To the south of the Lazarev Sea lies Princess Astrid Coast of Queen Maud Land.

The Lazarev Sea is a continental margin affected by multiple rifting episodes accompanied with transient volcanism. The Lazarev sea is also known to be very poor in sediment.

References 

 
Seas of the Southern Ocean
Antarctic region